The Barrett Juvenile Correctional Center, also known as the Barrett Learning Center and originally as the Virginia Industrial Home School for Wayward Colored Girls then the Virginia Industrial Home School for Colored Girls, was a juvenile correctional facility operated by the state of Virginia near Mechanicsville, Virginia.  

The facility was founded in 1915 as a facility for the detention and rehabilitation of African-American girls. The property was donated by the Virginia Federation of Colored Women's Clubs. The Women's Club was striving to provide a nurturing environment to enable the girls to become "respectable, useful women". The facility is notable for having the first African-American woman, Janie Porter Barrett, to head such an institution.  The facility was fully integrated by race in 1965, became coed in 1977, and then served an exclusively male population from 1978 until its closure in 2005.  The campus has a collection of mid-20th century buildings designed by Richmond architect Merrill C. Lee, and was listed on the National Register of Historic Places in 2016. Records for the institution are in the Library of Virginia.

See also
National Register of Historic Places listings in Hanover County, Virginia
Virginia Industrial School for Colored Girls, Social Welfare History Project

References

Further reading
Janie Porter Barrett and the Virginia Industrial School for Colored Girls: Community Response to the Needs of African American Children, by Wilma Peebles-Wilkins, Child Welfare 74, no. 1 (1995): 143–61

Historic districts on the National Register of Historic Places in Virginia
Infrastructure completed in 1915
Buildings and structures in Hanover County, Virginia
National Register of Historic Places in Hanover County, Virginia
Juvenile detention centers in the United States
2005 disestablishments in Virginia
Defunct prisons in Virginia
1915 establishments in Virginia